Guillermo Galeote Jiménez (6 May 1941 – 28 January 2021) was a Spanish doctor and politician who served as a member of the Congress of Deputies from 1977 to 1993 and as Secretary of Finance for the PSOE.

He was born in San Sebastián, and died of COVID-19 in Madrid, during the COVID-19 pandemic in Spain.

References

1941 births
2021 deaths
Spanish politicians
Deaths from the COVID-19 pandemic in Spain
People from San Sebastián